Glucan 1,4-alpha-maltohydrolase (maltogenic alpha-amylase, 1,4-alpha-D-glucan alpha-maltohydrolase) is an enzyme with systematic name 4-alpha-D-glucan alpha-maltohydrolase. This enzyme catalyses the following chemical reaction

 hydrolysis of (1->4)-alpha-D-glucosidic linkages in polysaccharides so as to remove successive alpha-maltose residues from the non-reducing ends of the chains

This enzyme acts on starch and related polysaccharides and oligosaccharides. Maltogenic amylases from Bacillus stearothermophilus, Thermus sp. and Geobacillus thermoleovorans are able to degrade acarbose to glucose and acarviosine-glucose.

References

External links 
 

EC 3.2.1